The Cultural heritage of Sayyid Mir Jan, also known as Sayyid ul Sadatiyya, is a tariqa with a central emphasis on the teachings of the Muslim Saint Sayyid Mir Jan. According to this tradition Sayyid Mir Jan is regarded as the rightful successor of Muhammad through his progeny, the Ahlul Bayt, and the Rashidun caliphs, based on the Mawaddat al Qurba Bloodline.

Mawaddat al-Qurba Bloodline 
The Hazrat Ishaans and their followers the Naqshbandis substantiate their leadership as rightful successors of Prophet Muhammad on the occasion of a certain biological line of Mawaddat al-Qurba from Muhammad over leading Awliya, so called Ghaus or Aqtab reaching Sayyid Mir Jan as the promised Khwaja-e-Khwajagan-Jahan, meaning "scholar of all scholars of the world". They all are descending from each other.
 Muhammad predicted the coming of his descendant the Muhammad al-Baqir al Hasani wal Husseini
 Muhammad Baqir predicted the coming of his descendant Ali, the Ridha men Ahlul bayt
 Ali al-Ridha predicted the coming of his descendant Muhammad al Mahdi, the Qaim
 Muhammad al Mahdi and his father Hasan al Askari as well as his little brother Sayyid Ali Akbar predicted the coming of Abdul Qadir, the Mohyuddin, "reviver of faith". This shows that the Imamate after Muhammad al Mahdi is continued reaching his relative Abdul Qadir Gilani.
 Abdul Qadir Gilani predicted the coming of Bahauddin, the Naqshband
 Bahauddin predicted the coming of his descendant Khawand Mahmud, the Hazrat Ishaan; Damrel highlights that the followers believe in the resurrection of Bahauddin (Persian:"Az Qabar Bar Amadah") in year 1598, proclaiming the succession of his descendant Mahmud.
 Hazrat Ishaan and his family predicted the coming of Sayyid Mir Jan, the Khwaja of all Khwajas; Qasvari in a same manner describes the belief of the resurrection of Mahmud in the end of the 19th century, proclaiming Sayyid Mir Jan as successor and promised "Khwaja of all Khwajas".

History 
Khwaja Khawand Mahmud bin Sharifuddin Al Alavi, known by his followers as "Hazrat Ishaan" was directed by his Pir Ishaq Wali Dahbidi to spread the Islam in Mughal India. His influence mostly remained in the Kashmir valley, whereupon Baqi Billah has expanded the order in other parts of India. Mahmud is a significant Saint of the order as he is a direct blood descendant in the 7th generation of Baha-ul-din Naqshband, the founder of the order and his son in law Ala-ul-din Atar. It is because of this that Mahmud claims direct spiritual connection to his ancestor Baha-u-din. Furthermore Mahmud had a significant amount of nobles as disciples, highlighting his popular influence in the Mughal Empire. His main emphasis was to highlight orthodox Sunni teachings. Mahmud's son Moinuddin lies buried in their Khanqah together with his wife who was the daughter of a Mughal Emperor. It is a pilgrimage site in which congregational prayers, known as "Khoja-Digar" are held in honor of Baha-ul-Din on his death anniversary the 3rd Rabi ul Awwal of the islamic lunar calendar. This practice including the "Khatm Muazzamt" is a practice that goes back to Mahmud and his son Moinuddin The Kashmiri population venerate Mahmud and his family as they are regarded them as the revivers of Islam in Kashmir. Mahmud was succeeded by his son Moinuddin and their progeny until the line died out on the occasion of the martyrdom of the last Ishan Kamaluddin and his family members by the Shiite warlord Amir Khan Jawansher in the eighteenth century.Moinuddin successors were:
 Bahauddin son of Mahmud
 Ahmad son of Mahmud
 Nizamuddin son of Sharifudin son of Moinuddin, marrying a daughter of Aurangzeb
 Nooruddin son of Nizamuddin
 Kamaluddin son of Nooruddin, martyred by the Shiite warlord Amir Khan Jawansher

Role of Sayyid Mir Jan 
Sayyid Mir Jan as the holy Ishan is a learned Alim, honored as the contemporary Qutb based on the psychospiritual Quranic concept of the Mawaddat al-Qurba. The idea of the pure-hearted Qutb is derived from the following Hadith of Muhammad:

"Allah Almighty has created three hundred people, whose hearts are like that of Adam, and He created forty people whose hearts are like Moses. He also created seven people whose hearts are like that of Abraham, and he created five people with a heart like that of Gabriel, and three people with a heart like that of Mika’il and only one person with a heart like that of Rafa’il (Raphael).  Such a person will live among the people, and through his prayers, by Allah Almighty’s permission, life and death, rain and prosperity will come and calamity will be averted."

Prophecy of Mahmud 

It is said that Mahmud and his son Moinuddin stated that under their progeny there will come a son of them, who will revive the spiritual lineage and legacy of the family after a tragic incident, that was to be the martyrdom of family members in Srinagar. It is accepted that this successor Sayyid Mir Jan.

See also 
 Sayyid Abdul Qadir Gilani
 Mawaddat al-Qurba
 Sayyid Ali Akbar ibn Hasan al Askari
 Sayyid Bahauddin Naqshband
 Hazrat Ishaan
 Ishan (Title)
 Sayyid Moinuddin Hadi Naqshband
 Ziyarat Naqshband Saheb
 Sayyid Mir Jan
 Sayyid Mahmud Agha
 Sayyid Mir Fazlullah Agha
 Dakik Family
 Royal Sayyids
 Barakzai Dynasty

References 

Sufi orders